Dafu Port is a port on Liuqiu Island in Pingtung County, Taiwan. It is a home port for fishing vessels that operate from the island. It is the second largest port on the island after Baisha Port.

Destination
The port serves ferries to Donggang Township on the island of Taiwan.

See also
 Transportation in Taiwan

References

Ports and harbors of Pingtung County